Chenar Sukhteh (also Romanized as Chenār Sūkhteh) is a village in Mazayjan Rural District, in the Central District of Bavanat County, Fars Province, Iran. At the 2006 census, its population was 142, in 34 families.

References 

Populated places in Bavanat County